Eric J. Lerner (born May 31, 1947) is an American popular science writer, and independent plasma researcher. He wrote the 1991 book The Big Bang Never Happened, which advocates Hannes Alfvén's plasma cosmology instead of the Big Bang theory. He is founder, president, and chief scientist of Lawrenceville Plasma Physics, Inc.

Professional work

Lerner received a BA in physics from Columbia University and started as a graduate student in physics at the University of Maryland, but left after a year due to his dissatisfaction with the mathematical rather than experimental approach there. He then pursued a career in popular science writing.

Lerner is an active general science writer, estimating that he has had about 600 articles published.  He has received journalism awards between 1984 and 1993 from the Aviation Space Writers Association. In 2006 he was a visiting scientist at the European Southern Observatory in Chile.

Lawrenceville Plasma Physics 
In 1984, he began studying plasma phenomena and laboratory fusion devices, performing experimental work on a machine called a dense plasma focus (DPF). NASA's Jet Propulsion Laboratory has funded mainstream as well as alternative approaches to fusion, and between 1994 and 2001 NASA provided a grant to Lawrenceville Plasma Physics, the company of which Lerner was the only employee, to explore whether Lerner's alternative approach to fusion might be useful to propel spacecraft; a 2007 New York Times article noted that Lerner had not received funding from the US Department of Energy. He believes that a dense plasma focus can also be used to produce useful aneutronic fusion energy. Lerner explained his "Focus Fusion" approach in a 2007 Google Tech Talk.

On November 14, 2008, Lerner received funding for continued research, to test the scientific feasibility of Focus Fusion.   On January 28, 2011, LPP published preliminary results. In March, 2012, the company published a paper saying that it had achieved temperatures of 1.8 billion degrees, beating the old record of 1.1 billion that had survived since 1978. In 2012 the company announced a collaboration with a lab at the Islamic Azad University Central Tehran Branch in Iran. In October 2021, the company announced improved results with the latest version of its device, with reduced erosion and higher temperatures, but the prior month, an independent expert stated that they were not close to a commercial fusion reactor with this device.

The Big Bang Never Happened

The Big Bang Never Happened: A Startling Refutation of the Dominant Theory of the Origin of the Universe (1991) is a book by Lerner which rejects mainstream Big Bang cosmology, and instead advances a non-standard plasma cosmology originally proposed in the 1960s by Hannes Alfvén, the 1970 Nobel Prize recipient in Physics. The book appeared at a time when results from the Cosmic Background Explorer satellite were of some concern to astrophysicists who expected to see cosmic microwave background anisotropies but instead measured a blackbody spectrum with little variation across the sky. Lerner referred to this as evidence that the Big Bang was a failed paradigm. He also denigrated the observational evidence for dark matter and recounted a well known cosmological feature that superclusters are larger than the largest structures that could have formed through gravitational collapse in the age of the universe.

As an alternative to the Big Bang, Lerner adopted Alfvén's model of plasma cosmology that relied on plasma physics to explain most, if not all, cosmological observations by appealing to electromagnetic forces. Adopting an eternal universe, Lerner's explanation of cosmological evolution relied on a model of thermodynamics based on the work of the Nobel Chemistry prize winner Ilya Prigogine under which order emerges from chaos. This is in apparent defiance of the second law of thermodynamics. As a way of partially acknowledging this, Lerner asserts that away from equilibrium order can spontaneously form by taking advantage of energy flows, as argued more recently by American astrophysicist Eric Chaisson.

Lerner's ideas have been rejected by mainstream physicists and cosmologists. In these critiques, critics have explained that, contrary to Lerner's assertions, the size of superclusters is a feature limited by subsequent observations to the end of greatness and is consistent with having arisen from a power spectrum of density fluctuations growing from the quantum fluctuations predicted in inflationary models. Anisotropies were discovered in subsequent analysis of both the COBE and BOOMERanG experiments and were more fully characterized by the Wilkinson Microwave Anisotropy Probe and Planck.

Physical cosmologists who have commented on the book have generally dismissed it. In particular, American astrophysicist and cosmologist Edward L. Wright criticized Lerner for making errors of fact and interpretation, arguing that:
 Lerner's alternative model for Hubble's Law is dynamically unstable
 the number density of distant radio sources falsifies Lerner's explanation for the cosmic microwave background
 Lerner's explanation that the helium abundance is due to stellar nucleosynthesis fails because of the small observed abundance of heavier elements
Lerner has disputed Wright's critique.

Activism
While at Columbia, Lerner participated in the 1965 Selma March and helped organize the 1968 Columbia Student Strike.

In the 1970s, Lerner became involved in the National Caucus of Labor Committees, an offshoot of the Columbia University Students for a Democratic Society. Lerner left the National Caucus in 1978, later stating in a lawsuit that he had resisted pressure from the U.S. Labor Party, an organization led by Lyndon LaRouche, to violate election law by channeling profits of an engineering firm to the organization.

More recently, Lerner sought civil rights protection for immigrants as a member and spokesman for the New Jersey Civil Rights Defense Committee. He participated in the Occupy Wall Street protests in 2011.

References

External links 
 LPPFusion
 Focus Fusion Society
 The Big Bang Never Happened (archived)
 Cem anos após Engels, onde está o enfoque histórico nas ciências? 

People from Brookline, Massachusetts
21st-century American inventors
21st-century American physicists
Columbia College (New York) alumni
Living people
American science writers
American socialists
American cosmologists
1947 births
Plasma physicists